Republika Srpska elects on a national level a legislature and a president. The National Assembly of the Republika Srpska (Narodna skupština Republike Srpske) has 83 members elected for a four-year term. Republika Srpska has a multi-party system, with numerous parties in which no one party usually has a chance of gaining power alone, and parties must work with each other to form coalition governments. A party must receive at least 3% of the votes in one of the nine electoral districts to qualify for any seats.

2014 elections

In the 2014 general elections in Republika Srpska, the incumbent President Milorad Dodik was re-elected, running on a joint Alliance of Independent Social Democrats–Democratic People's Alliance–Socialist Party platform, whilst his Alliance of Independent Social Democrats remained the largest in the National Assembly.

Elections in Bosnia and Herzegovina
 
Politics of Republika Srpska
Central Election Commission of Bosnia and Herzegovina